Thoracochaeta zosterae is a species of fly in the family Sphaeroceridae, the lesser dung flies. It is found in the  Palearctic .
Thoracochaeta zosterae is a typical inhabitant of sea coasts. The larvae live in seaweed.

References

Sphaeroceridae
Insects described in 1833